Mahurangi West is a rural settlement in the Auckland Region of New Zealand.  Puhoi is to the west, Mahurangi Harbour is to the east, and the western part of Mahurangi Regional Park is southeast.

Mahurangi Heads West School operated from 1886 to 1946. It was a half-time school for the early part of this period, sharing its teacher with another school. The school building is now Mahurangi West Hall.

Demographics
Mahurangi West is part of the larger Puhoi Valley statistical area.

Mahurangi West had a population of 87 at the 2018 New Zealand census, an increase of 15 people (20.8%) since the 2013 census, and an increase of 12 people (16.0%) since the 2006 census. There were 39 households, comprising 42 males and 45 females, giving a sex ratio of 0.93 males per female. The median age was 57.7 years (compared with 37.4 years nationally), with 12 people (13.8%) aged under 15 years, 9 (10.3%) aged 15 to 29, 36 (41.4%) aged 30 to 64, and 30 (34.5%) aged 65 or older.

Ethnicities were 96.6% European/Pākehā, and 10.3% Māori. People may identify with more than one ethnicity.

Although some people chose not to answer the census's question about religious affiliation, 58.6% had no religion, 34.5% were Christian and 3.4% were Buddhist.

Of those at least 15 years old, 27 (36.0%) people had a bachelor's or higher degree, and 9 (12.0%) people had no formal qualifications. The median income was $25,500, compared with $31,800 nationally. 21 people (28.0%) earned over $70,000 compared to 17.2% nationally. The employment status of those at least 15 was that 21 (28.0%) people were employed full-time, 15 (20.0%) were part-time, and 3 (4.0%) were unemployed.

Notes

Matakana Coast
Rodney Local Board Area
Populated places in the Auckland Region